B. R. Vijayalakshmi is an Indian cinematographer.

Early life 
She is the daughter of veteran legendary film director and producer B. R. Panthulu.

He died while she was in college. She decided to devote herself to cinema.

Career 
She worked as an interior designer before entering into films.

She started her career as an assistant to cinematographer Ashok Kumar who convinced her to leave film school to work as a camera assistant. She worked for Kumar on the 1980 Tamil film Nenjathai Killathe and continued for nearly 30 films over the next three years. During this time she did "Clash work" for films such as Kai Kodukkum Kai (1984) and Pillai Nila (1985). 

Her feature film debut came in 1985 with the Tamil film Chinna Veedu. Known as Asia's first woman cinematographer, Vijayalakshmi has worked in 22 feature films between 1985 and 1995. Her films included Aruvadai Naal (1986), Sirai Paravai (1987) and Iniya Uravu Poothathu (1987) for directors including C. V. Sridhar and G. M. Kumar. She wrote the script for Sangeeth Sivan's Malayalam film Daddy (1992). In 1995, she made her directorial debut through Paattu Padava for which she wrote the script and handled the cinematography. The film was screened at the International Film Festival of India in 1996 and it was known for its songs by Ilaiyaraaja.

In addition to her film career, she worked on many television series including My Dear Boodham (My Dear Ddevil), Velan, and Raja Rajeswari.

She is the first to have brought computer graphics to Tamil TV shows. She has done other south Indian soap operas such as Athipookkal Valli. After her wedding she left films and entered television. Children's serial Vasantham Colony was her first attempt at TV. Maya Machindra (Vijay TV) and Velan (Sun TV) are among the other prominent television series that she has worked on. 

She was appointed as the creative head of Saregama, an Indian music company. In September 2005, she became the business head of the TV Software Division of the company. Saregama later moved into the manufacturing and sales of radio-like MP3 players called caravona.

Personal life 
Her brother B.R. Ravishankar is a film-maker in Kannada cinema. He is an IIT graduate. He entered cinema after the death of his father. 

She is a friend of actress/film maker Suhasini since childhood. Manirathnam was a close teenage  friend of B.R.Ravi (Vijayalakshmi's brother) which led to Suhasini-Manirthnam's romantic marriage. 

Vijayalakshmi married Sunil Kumar, a sound recordist and has a son with him.

Partial filmography

As cinematographer

 Chinna Veedu (1985)
 Aruvadai Naal (1986)
 Iniya Uravu Poothathu (1987)
 Sirai Paravai (1987)
 Therkathi Kallan (1988)
 December 31 (1988)
 En Purushanthaan Enakku Mattumthaan (1989)
 Poruthathu Pothum (1989)
 Mallu Vetti Minor (1990)
 Manasara Vazhthungalen (1991)
 Manitha Jaathi (1991)
 Thalattu Ketkuthamma (1991)
 Vetri Padigal (1991)
 Kottai Vaasal (1992)
 Therku Theru Machan (1992)
 Thalattu (1993)
 Ravanan (1994)
 Paattu Padava (1995)

As writer
 Daddy (1992)

As director
 Pattu padava (1995)
 Abhi & Anu (2018)
 Abhiyude Kadha Anuvinteyum (2018) - Malayalam

Television
 velan (2002)
 maya machinthra (2003)

References

Living people
Indian women cinematographers
Indian women film directors
Tamil film cinematographers
Telugu people
20th-century Indian women artists
People from Kolar
Women artists from Karnataka
Film directors from Karnataka
20th-century Indian film directors
20th-century Indian photographers
Cinematographers from Karnataka
Year of birth missing (living people)